The 2015–16 Nemzeti Bajnokság I is the 71st season of the Nemzeti Bajnokság I, Hungary's premier Volleyball league.

In season 2015/2016 Hungary will be representing by Kaposvár Volley in CEV Challenge Cup.

Team information 

The following 11 clubs compete in the NB I during the 2015–16 season:

Regular season (Alapszakasz) 

|}

Playoffs 
Teams in bold won the playoff series. Numbers to the left of each team indicate the team's original playoff seeding. Numbers to the right indicate the score of each playoff game.

Final
(to 3 victories)

|}

Season statistics

Number of teams by counties

External links
 Hungarian Volleyball Federaration 

Nemzeti Bajnoksag
Nemzeti Bajnoksag
Hungary